New York Mills may refer to a location in the United States:

 New York Mills, Minnesota
 New York Mills, New York